Muzaffer al-Din Yavlak Arslan was the third bey of the Chobanids. In Selçukname, he is referred to as Melik Muzaffer al-Din.

Reign 
It was understood that the task of protecting the Seljuk-Byzantine border from the Byzantines in northwest Anatolia belonged to the Chobanids.

Early years 
Although the Chobanids lived fairly peacefully in Arslan's early reign, other principalities definitely didn't. Anatolia was in a state of turmoil due to throne changes and the chaos of the Ilkhanate Mongols however Yavlak Arslan elected to continue with his father's policy of loyalty to the Ilkhanate.

Death
In 1292, the leader of the Ilkhanate, Arghun Khan, died and was succeeded by his brother Gaykhatu. The Turks of Anatolia led a revolution.
Seeing the opportunity, the vassalised Seljuq Sultan, Mesud II's brother Kilij Arslan V, rebelled against his brother. When Gaykhatu came to Anatolia with his army, Kilij Arslan moved to Yavlak Arslan's capital, Kastamonu, and organized the Turkmens there. Muzaffer al-Din Yavlak Arslan's side in this rebellion is mixed. Although he wrote that he opposed Mesud and Kilij Arslan organised the Turkmen in Kastamonu, some sources wrote that Muzaffereddin Yavlak Arslan opposed Kılıçarslan and was killed by him.

As a result, Muzaffer al-Din Yavlak Arslan was killed during the rebellion, and the region was given to the Seljuq commander Shams al-Din Yaman Jandar, whose descendants were to found the Jandarid Principality in the same region. His grave is thought to be in Aşköprü or Kastamonu.

In popular culture 
In the Turkish TV series, Kuruluş: Osman, he is portrayed by the Turkish actor . A historian was concerned over the fact that such an important and great person from history was being portrayed in a negative way, but Mehmet Bozdağ, the producer of the series, assured him that after a few episodes, Yavlak Arslan will end up becoming a 'real hero'. Later on, Mehmet's claims turned out to be correct.

References 

13th-century people from the Ottoman Empire
Chobanids
Wars involving the Ilkhanate
History of Kastamonu